The Arctic is Earth's north polar region.

Arctic may also refer to:

Places
Arctic, Rhode Island, a village in West Warwick, Rhode Island
Arctic Ocean

Ships
 Arctic (tug), a wooden-hulled tugboat on the Great Lakes of North America 1881–1930
 MV Arctic, an icebreaking cargo ship built in 1978
 SS Arctic, a paddle steamer in the Collins Line steamships that began operating in 1850 and was sunk in a collision in 1854
, a survey ship in commission in the United States Coast Survey from 1856 to 1858
, various United States Navy ships of the name
, a United States Navy fast combat support ship in non-commissioned service in the Military Sealift Command from 1995 to 2002

Other uses
Arctic (company), a Swiss manufacturer of computer hardware and consumer electronics
Arctic S.A., a Romanian household appliances brand owned by Arçelik
ARCTIC (ISS Facility), a temperature-controlled environment for storing biological samples on the International Space Station
Arctic (journal)
Arctic (film), a 2018 film directed by Joe Penna starring Mads Mikkelsen

See also

 
Tundra, a climate found in the Arctic, the Antarctic, and alpine regions
Arctic Circle
Arctic Cooperation and Politics
Arctic Report Card
Arctica (disambiguation)
Antarctica (disambiguation)
Antarctic (disambiguation)
Arktos (disambiguation)
Artic (disambiguation)
Artik (disambiguation)